Threads of Fate is a 1917 American silent drama film directed by Eugene Nowland and starring Viola Dana, Augustus Phillips and Richard Tucker.

Cast
 Viola Dana as Dorothea
 Augustus Phillips as Tom Wentworth
 Richard Tucker as Dr. Grant Hunter
 Fred C. Jones as Marquis Giovanni del Carnacacchi 
 Helen Strickland as Sarah Wentworth
 Nellie Grant as 	Marcella
 Robert Whittier as Jim Gregory

References

Bibliography
 Leonhard Gmür. Rex Ingram: Hollywood's Rebel of the Silver Screen. 2013.

External links
 

1917 films
1917 drama films
1910s English-language films
American silent feature films
Silent American drama films
American black-and-white films
Films directed by Eugene Nowland
Metro Pictures films
1910s American films
English-language drama films